The Lifebox Foundation, commonly known as Lifebox, is a non-profit organization that improves the safety of surgery in low-income countries.

Background 
Use of checklists in surgery reduces mortality by 24%, yet World Health Organization surgical checklists are published in Arabic, Chinese, English, French, Russian and Spanish and use of them is low in countries where people speak other languages, notably low-income countries.

History 

Lifebox was formed as a charity in the United Kingdom in 2011, and in the United States in 2015. 

The original formation of the organization included representatives of World Federation of Societies of Anaesthesiologists, the Association of Anaesthetists of Great Britain and Ireland, and the Harvard School of Public Health and is chaired by Atul Gawande.

Activities 
The organization promotes the use of checklists before medical surgeries. Use of the checklists reduces surgical mortality and complications.

Lifebox organized hospitals to pool their purchasing power to reduce the cost of pulse oximeters from US$2,000 to $250, and distributed 22,000 hospital-grade pulse oximeters. Lifebox also provides anesthesia training.

References

External links 

 Official website
Non-governmental organizations
Surgical organizations
2011 establishments in England
Anesthesia
Anesthesiology organizations
Medical and health organisations based in the United Kingdom
Medical and health organizations based in the United States